Mohamoud Hassan Saad also Known as Saajin is a Somali politician, who is currently serving as the Minister of Commerce, Industries and Tourism of Somaliland.

See also
Waxa uu dhashay qiyaastii 1942

 Ministry of Commerce (Somaliland)
 Somaliland Chamber of Commerce
 Politics of Somaliland
 List of Somaliland politicians

References

People from Hargeisa
Peace, Unity, and Development Party politicians
Living people
Government ministers of Somaliland
Year of birth missing (living people)